The first general election to the Highland Council was held in May 1999, using 80 wards created for that election, and which remain in use today. Each ward elects one councillor by the first past the post system of election. Elections are held on a four-year cycle: therefore the next general election was in 2003.

In 1999 the council had been functioning since 1996, but prior to the 1999 election it had consisted of councillors elected to the earlier regional council which covered the same Highland area.

Wards are grouped into areas. Councillors elected from a particular area become members of the relevant area committee. The committee areas are similar to the districts which were abolished in 1996, when the Highland region became a unitary council area.

Badenoch and Strathspey wards 
There are five wards in the Badenoch and Strathspey area:

Caithness wards 
There are 10 wards in the Caithness area:

Inverness wards 
The Inverness area includes Loch Ness, Strathglass and the City of Inverness.

The city lacks clearly defined boundaries. In ward descriptions below the city means the urban area centred on the former burgh of Inverness.
 
There are 23 wards in the area:

Lochaber wards 
There are eight wards in the Lochaber area:

Nairn wards 

The Nairn area is mostly rural. Ward boundaries radiate from the town of Nairn (a former burgh), dividing the town between all four wards:

Ross and Cromarty wards 
There are 18 wards in the Ross and Cromarty area:

Skye and Lochalsh area 
There are six wards in the Skye and Lochalsh area:

Sutherland area 
There are six wards in the Sutherland area:

External links 

Highland Council (Comhairle na Gaidhealtachd) web site:
 Main page
 Maps of committee areas and wards

Highland council wards
Lists of wards in Scotland